Moustafa Ramadan Hussein (born 4 February 1967) is an Egyptian wrestler. He competed at the 1988 Summer Olympics, the 1992 Summer Olympics and the 1996 Summer Olympics.

References

1967 births
Living people
Egyptian male sport wrestlers
Olympic wrestlers of Egypt
Wrestlers at the 1988 Summer Olympics
Wrestlers at the 1992 Summer Olympics
Wrestlers at the 1996 Summer Olympics
Place of birth missing (living people)
20th-century Egyptian people
21st-century Egyptian people